Greetings Bait is a 1943 Oscar-nominated Warner Bros. Merrie Melodies cartoon, directed by Friz Freleng. The short was released on May 15, 1943.

It features a split-screen view of a crab's view of the underwater world in which his independently moving eyes (on eye stalks) see the world completely differently from each other.  The worm and the fisherman are caricatures of Jerry Colonna, and the title is a reference to his weekly greeting on Bob Hope's radio show, "Greetings, Gates".  The same worm was also featured in the 1941 Warner's cartoon, The Wacky Worm.

Personnel
None of the filmmakers are credited on screen. The cartoon personnel are as follows:
Director: Isadore Freleng
Producer: Leon Schlesinger
Voices: Mel Blanc
Character animation: Manuel Perez, Ken Champin, Gerry Chiniquy
Story: Tedd Pierce
Music: Carl W. Stalling

Home media
It is available on DVD on the Action In the North Atlantic disc (part of the Humphrey Bogart: The Signature Collection, Vol. 2)

References

External links 
 

Merrie Melodies short films
1943 animated films
1943 films
Short films directed by Friz Freleng
Films produced by Leon Schlesinger
Films scored by Carl Stalling
1940s Warner Bros. animated short films